In mathematics and control theory, H2, or H-square is a Hardy space with square norm. It is a subspace of L2 space, and is thus a Hilbert space.  In particular, it is a reproducing kernel Hilbert space.

On the unit circle 
In general, elements of L2 on the unit circle are given by

whereas elements of H2 are given by

The projection from L2 to H2 (by setting an = 0 when n < 0) is orthogonal.

On the half-plane 
The Laplace transform  given by

can be understood as a linear operator

It is more; it is an isomorphism, in that it is invertible, and it isometric, in that it satisfies

The Laplace transform is "half" of a Fourier transform; from the decomposition

one then obtains an orthogonal decomposition of  into two Hardy spaces

This is essentially the Paley-Wiener theorem.

See also
 H∞

References
 Jonathan R. Partington, "Linear Operators and Linear Systems, An Analytical Approach to Control Theory", London Mathematical Society Student Texts 60, (2004) Cambridge University Press, .

Control theory
Mathematical analysis